The New Carrollton–Fort Totten Line, designated Route F6, is a weekday-only bus route operated by the Washington Metropolitan Area Transit Authority between the New Carrollton station of the Orange Line station of the Washington Metro and the Fort Totten station of the Red, Green, and Yellow Lines of the Washington Metro. The line operates every 30 minutes during peak hours and 60 minutes all other times, weekdays only. F6 trips are roughly 60 minutes. This route provides weekday service between Fort Totten and New Carrollton stations without having to take the train into Downtown DC.

Background
Route F6 operates weekdays only between New Carrollton station and Fort Totten station mostly along Sargent Road, Good Luck Road, Finns Lane, Campus Drive, Ager Road, and University Boulevard without having to take the train. It connects the New Carrollton, Riverdale, College Park , University Park, Hyattsville, Green Meadows, Chillum, Queens Chapel, and North Michigan Park communities to various Metrorail stations and parts of Northeast DC.

Route F6 currently operates out of Landover division.

Route F6 stops

History
Route F6 had a prior "incarnation" operating as part of the former Capital Transit Company's "Sargent Road" Line between 12th & Quincy Street NE in Brookland, D.C. and Green Meadows, MD (some trips; however, would be shortened to operate only up to Gallatin Street NE & South Dakota Avenue NE in North Michigan Park, D.C.). F6 later on became a DC Transit Route during the 1950's and ended up being discontinued in the late 1960's and being replaced by the F5 & F7 Metrobus Routes.

Route F4, on the other hand, had a prior "incarnation" operating as part of the former Capital Transit Company "Michigan Avenue" Line between Eastern Avenue NE & Michigan Avenue NE (Avondale) and 9th Street NW & Constitution Avenue NW (Archives). Just like the F6 Route, F4 eventually became a DC Transit Route during the 1950's, before ultimately becoming a WMATA Metrobus Route on February 4, 1973 when the "Metrobus" System was formed.

The F4 & F6 "Prince George's – Silver Spring" Line was created as a brand new line on February 19, 1978 shortly after the Silver Spring station opened, in to replace the former segment of J2 & J4's routing between Silver Spring and Beltway Plaza, that had been discontinued when Routes J2 & J4 were truncated to only operate up to the Silver Spring station.

Route J2 originally operated as part of the "East - West Highway" Line all the way between Montgomery Mall and Beltway Plaza, while Route J4 originally operated as part of the "East - West Highway" Line all the way between Chevy Chase Circle and Beltway Plaza. 

The "East - West Highway" Line was basically split apart into two separate lines, with Routes J2 & J4 operating as part of the new, "Bethesda - Silver Spring" Line, keeping their routing between the Silver Spring station and Montgomery Mall (J2)/Chevy Chase Circle (J4) the exact same, while Route F6 replaced J4's routing between Silver Spring and the Prince George's Plaza Shopping Center, as well as both J2 & J4's routing between the Prince George's Plaza Shopping Center & Beltway Plaza, via the University of Maryland, while Route F4 replaced J2's routing between Silver Spring & the Prince George's Plaza Shopping Center. However; F4 would provide new Metrobus Service on the East - West Highway/Riverdale Road corridor between the Prince George's Plaza Shopping Center and New Carrollton, MD, via Belcrest Road, Queensbury Road, 48th Avenue (towards New Carrollton), Lafayette Avenue (towards Silver Spring station), and Riverdale Road. On the other hand, F6 was extended east of Beltway Plaza to Greenbelt Center (Crescent Road & Gardenway) in order to provide new Metrobus service to the Old Greenbelt region of Greenbelt, MD.

On December 3, 1978 shortly after the New Carrollton station opened, F4 was extended from the intersection of Riverdale Road & Annapolis Road in New Carrollton, MD, to the New Carrollton station. 

On December 11, 1993, the F6 was rerouted to operate between the and New Carrollton and Prince George's Plaza stations, via Ellin Road, Harkins Road, Finns Lane, Riverdale Road, Auburn Avenue, Good Luck Road, Kenilworth Avenue, River Road, the College Park - U of MD station, River Road, Kenilworth Avenue, East-West Highway, the Prince George's Plaza Shopping Center, Belcrest Road, Queens Chapel Road, Hamilton Street, Ager Road, the West Hyattsville station, Ager Road, and East-West Highway.  The segment of F6's former routing between the intersection of Campus Drive & Adelphi Road (University of Maryland College Park Campus) and Greenbelt Center (Crescent Road & Gardenway), was taken over by the C2 Metrobus Route. However; F6 was forced to temporarily stop operating on its usual routing between the Prince George's Plaza Shopping Center and University of Maryland College Park Campus, via Belcrest Road, Adelphi Road, and Campus Drive, as Paint Branch Parkway was not finished being constructed between the intersections of Baltimore Avenue (where Campus Drive ends) and River Road, at the time. Paint Branch Parkway would take another two to three years to finish being constructed. As a result, F6 was instead temporarily forced to operate on a detour route between the Prince George's Plaza and College Park - U of MD stations, via East-West Highway, Kenilworth Avenue, and River Road, before being able to operate on its routing towards the New Carrollton station, via River Road, Kenilworth Avenue, Good Luck Road, Auburn Avenue, Riverdale Road, Finns Lane, Harkins Road, and Ellin Road.

Then, sometime around 1996 once Paint Branch Parkway was finished being constructed and opened to traffic, F6 was rerouted to operate between the Prince George's Plaza and College Park - U of MD stations, via Belcrest Road, Adelphi Road, Campus Drive, Paint Branch Parkway, and River Road, as opposed to the detour route it had been operating on via East-West Highway, Kenilworth Avenue, and River Road. After serving the College Park - U of MD station, F6 would still operate on its usual routing between the College Park - U of MD and New Carrollton stations.

On September 20, 1999, F6 was once again extended back to its original terminus at the Silver Spring Station, following its usual routing between the New Carrollton station and intersection of Ager Road & East-West Highway in Green Meadows, MD, then operating on its original routing to the Silver Spring station parallel to the F4 Route, via East-West Highway, Ethan-Allen Avenue, Philadelphia Avenue, Fenton Street, and Colesville Road.

On May 15, 2003, the former Metrobus bus bays in front of the former G.C. Murphy store inside Prince George's Plaza, were demolished in order to build a new Target store. Routes F4 and F6 stopped directing entering into and looping inside the Prince George's Plaza.

On September 28, 2008, due to the Silver Spring station Bus Bay and Kiss & Ride Lot were closed off due to the construction of the brand new Silver Spring Transit Center, routes F4 and F6 Metrobus Stop at Silver Spring was temporarily relocated from Bay N, to the jughandle at the intersection of Wayne Avenue and Colesville Road, across Silver Spring station until September, 2015 when the Paul S. Sarbanes Transit Center was finished being constructed and officially opened.

During 2011, WMATA proposed to split the F4 and F6 routing into two routes. While the F4 remained the same, the F6 was proposed be rerouted to serve Fort Totten, keeping its routing between the New Carrollton station & the intersection of East-West Highway & Riggs Road the same, except route F6 would be rerouted to operate on the Route R3 routing between the intersection of Riggs Road & East-West Highway & Fort Totten along East-West Highway, Riggs Road, Sargent Road. This was proposed in order to reduce redundancy with F4 between Silver Spring station and the East West Highway and Riggs Road intersection. The proposal was brought up again in 2012 with the same similarities.

On June 17, 2012, F6 was rerouted to operate between the New Carrollton and Fort Totten stations, instead of operating between the New Carrollton and Silver Spring stations. While the segment of F6's routing between New Carrollton and the intersection of East–West Highway and Riggs Road would remain the same, route F6 was rerouted to replace the segment of the R3 routing between the intersection of East–West Highway and Riggs Road and Fort Totten station, by turning onto Riggs Road, and then operating via Sargent Road/Sargent Road NE, Gallatin Street NE, South Dakota Avenue NE, and Galloway Street NE. Route F4 added extra trips in order to supplement route F6 riders between Silver Spring and Riggs Road. Route F6 would be renamed to the New Carrollton–Fort Totten Line as a result of the changes.

Beginning on September 1, 2019 for nine months, the College Park Metrobus loop was temporarily closed for construction of the Purple line at College Park station having all stops located along River Road. As of a result, route F6's bus stops were moved onto River Road in order to serve the station. There were no detours that affected route F6.

All route F6 service was suspended due to WMATA's response to the COVID-19 pandemic beginning on March 16, 2020. Route F6 was fully restored on August 23, 2020.

References

F6
Orange Line (Washington Metro)
1978 establishments in Washington, D.C.
2012 disestablishments in Washington, D.C.
Transportation in Prince George's County, Maryland